Peoples Drug was a chain of drugstores based in Alexandria, Virginia.  Founded in 1905, Peoples was subsequently purchased by Lane Drug in 1975, Imasco in 1984, and finally by CVS in 1990, which continued to run the stores under the Peoples banner until 1994, at which time the stores were converted to CVS, marking the end of the use of the Peoples Drug name.

History
Peoples Drug was founded by Malcolm Gibbs in 1905 at 824 7th Street, NW. By 1930, it had 110 stores operating under the Peoples Drugs, Days Drug, and Shearer Drug names.  There were variations of the name, with Peoples Service Drug, and Gibbs Peoples Drug being most common.

In 1970, Peoples had 252 stores operating in the District of Columbia, Maryland, Virginia, Pennsylvania, Ohio, West Virginia, North Carolina, South Carolina, Florida, New York, and New Jersey.  That year there were 5,500 employees, with sales of $220 million and profits of $1.87 million. By 1975, Peoples had grown to 500 stores.  Later in the year, the chain was purchased by Lane Drug of Toledo, Ohio., The new company retained the Peoples name, and included Lane Drug, Schuman Drug, Dynamic Drug, Health Mart, Reed Drug, and Lee Drug.

Lane president Sheldon "Bud" Fantle took over the presidency of the chain and went to work on improving merchandising and customer service at Peoples. In 1980, Peoples acquired the Indianapolis-based Haag Drug which had 80 drug stores in Indiana, Iowa, Illinois and Kentucky. In 1985, two  "Bud's Deep Discount Drug Stores" were opened in the Toledo area, with others in the Washington, D.C. metropolitan area. The name "Bud's" was derived from the nickname of Sheldon "Bud" Fantle. In January, 1987, Mr. Fantle left Peoples and later took control of troubled Dart Drug in Washington DC, renaming those stores Fantle's.

Acquisition by Imasco
In 1984, Peoples was acquired for $320 million by the Canadian conglomerate Imasco, the Canadian arm of British American Tobacco, and owner of Shoppers Drug Mart and Pharmaprix in Canada. At that time, Peoples and its divisions had close to 800 stores and became one of the country's leading drug chains.

After being acquired by Imasco, Peoples quickly acquired Rea & Derick in 1985 and also took control of the Florida Shoppers Drug Mart locations.

Sales and conversions

Over the years, the Haag stores were converted to Peoples in 1983, and Dynamic and Schuman were converted to Lane. A program was implemented to convert all stores to the Peoples Drug name.  Many Lane and Rea & Derick stores were converted, all stores began selling Peoples Brand product, and began using bags with the Peoples Drug logo.  Not long after being acquired by Imasco in 1984, Peoples decided to sell some of their stores and concentrate on the Mid Atlantic states.

First to go were the 35 Florida Shoppers Drug Mart stores that was sold to Eckerd in 1986.  Next was the Atlanta based Reed/Lee Drug to Big B Drugs in 1989 for $50 million. The 85 store division gave Big B their entrance into the Atlanta market, a goal they had been working on for years. The next sale was the 114-store Lane drug to Rite Aid, effective April 11, 1989. The last phase was the Indiana division of Peoples being sold in 1989 to a group of former Rite Aid officials that was headed by Roger Grass, changing the former Peoples stores to Reliable Drugs.  Reliable survived only four years before it filed for bankruptcy and its stores were sold off to Osco Drug and Rite Aid in 1993.

Sale to CVS

After the dust settled from the sales, Imasco decided to unload the Peoples Drug chain, as Peoples was not performing at the level Imasco had hoped. In late 1990, CVS Corporation purchased Peoples for $330 Million. CVS kept the Peoples Drug name in place, remodeled most stores to the CVS format and improved the stores' sales. The Peoples name was considered to be too strong a name to change it to CVS/pharmacy immediately. The name did ultimately change in May 1994, just a few months before the Peoples Drug name would have celebrated its 90th anniversary.

References

Further reading

 Peoples Drug Store Annual Reports 1965-1983
 Imasco Enterprises Annual Reports 1984-1990
 Melville Corporation Annual Reports 1991-1995
 "The Chain Welder", Peoples Drug Company Magazine 1920-1937
 "Employee Handbook"  Peoples Drug, August 1979
 "Peoples People" Peoples Drug Company Magazine 1941-1958

Defunct pharmacies of the United States
Defunct companies based in Washington, D.C.
American companies established in 1905
Retail companies established in 1905
Retail companies disestablished in 1994
1905 establishments in Washington, D.C.
1994 disestablishments in Washington, D.C.
CVS Health
Health care companies based in Virginia